The Halle Open is a men's tennis tournament held in Halle, North Rhine-Westphalia, Germany. Held since 1993, the event is played on four outdoor grass courts and is a part of the ATP Tour 500 series on the ATP Tour schedule.

Between 1993 and 2018 it was sponsored by Gerry Weber. It was sponsored by Noventi from 2019 to 2021. In December 2021, a change of primary sponsor and name was announced. For the years 2022 and 2023, the tournament will be known as the Terra Wortmann Open.    

The Halle Open is held at the same time as the Queens Club Championships, and the two are seen as the primary warm-up tournaments for the Wimbledon Grand Slam tournament, also on grass courts, which begins towards the end of June. The event was upgraded in 2015 from a 250 series to a 500 series tournament.

The Centre Court (the Gerry Weber Stadion) has 12,300 seats and a retractable roof which can be closed in 88 seconds so that tennis matches can continue with a closed roof when it begins to rain. The stadium is heated and also used for other sport events (handball, basketball, volleyball and boxing) and concerts.

Past finals
In singles, Roger Federer (2003–06, 2008, 2013–15, 2017, 2019) holds the record for most overall titles (ten, out of thirteen finals), and most consecutive titles (four, in 2003–06). In doubles, Raven Klaasen (2015–16, 2019) holds the record for most titles with three, and co-holds the one for consecutive titles with Aisam-ul-Haq Qureshi (2011–12), Rajeev Ram (2015–16), Łukasz Kubot (2017–18) and Marcelo Melo (2017–18), at two.

Singles

Doubles

Statistics

Multiple championships

Championships by country

Notes

References

External links

Official tournament website
ATP tournament profile

 
Tennis tournaments in Germany
Grass court tennis tournaments
Sport in North Rhine-Westphalia
Halle (Westfalen)
Recurring sporting events established in 1993
ATP Tour 250
1993 establishments in Germany